Events in the year 1998 in the Netherlands.

Incumbents
 Monarch: Beatrix
 Prime Minister: Wim Kok

Events
6 May – The 1998 Dutch general election 
4 to 11 October – The 1998 UCI Road World Championships took place in Valkenburg aan de Geul.
18 November – The Dutch Far Right Nationalist party Centre Party '86 was banned by the Amsterdam court, becoming one of the first parties banned in the Netherlands.

Births

6 January – Merel Freriks, handball player.
23 January Nils Eekhoff, cyclist .
4 February – Luna Bijl, fashion model 
6 February – Ide Schelling, cyclist.
13 March – Jay-Roy Grot, footballer
18 June – Sarah Nauta, singer and actress
8 July – Koen Huntelaar, footballer
10 July – Yasmin Wijnaldum, fashion model
4 September – Geert Nentjes, darts player
3 October – Pleun Bierbooms, singer 
31 October – Hawijch Elders, violinist
2 December – Sophie Francis, record producer 
9 December – Famke Louise, You Tuber
30 December – Jutta Leerdam, speed skater

Deaths

1 January – Alfred Lagarde, voice actor (b. 1948)
23 January – Violette Cornelius, photographer and resistance fighter (b. 1919)
14 February – Gien de Kock, athlete (b. 1908).
2 April – Gerrit Jan van Ingen Schenau, biomechanist (b. 1944)
22 April – Edward Brongersma, politician (b. 1911)
30 April – Jopie Selbach, freestyle swimmer (b. 1918).
11 May
 Willy Corsari, Dutch author of detective fiction (b. 1897).
 Hans van Zon, serial killer (b. 1941)
27 June – Alfred Kossmann, poet (b. 1922)
7 October – Cees de Vreugd, butcher, strongman and powerlifter (b. 1952) 
6 November – Johfra Bosschart, artist (b. 1919)
29 November – Maus Gatsonides, rally driver and inventor (b. 1911)
13 December – Willem den Toom, politician (b. 1911)
24 December – Daan Kagchelland, sailor (b. 1914).

Full date missing
Emmy van Deventer, ceramist (b. 1915)
Aat de Peijper, industrialist and philatelist
Pi Vèriss, songwriter and composer (b. 1916)

References

 
1990s in the Netherlands
Years of the 20th century in the Netherlands
Netherlands
Netherlands